Chen Ting (born 7 May 1983) is a Taiwanese diver. She competed in the women's 3 metre springboard event at the 2000 Summer Olympics.

References

1983 births
Living people
Taiwanese female divers
Olympic divers of Taiwan
Divers at the 2000 Summer Olympics
Place of birth missing (living people)
Divers at the 1998 Asian Games
Asian Games competitors for Chinese Taipei